The Adam Mickiewicz Museum (in French: 
Musée Adam Mickiewicz) is a small museum dedicated to Polish poet Adam Mickiewicz (1798–1855). It is located within the Polish Library in Paris in the 4th arrondissement of Paris at 6, Quai d'Orleans, Paris, France.

The museum was established in 1930, and contains numerous personal effects as well as an archive including many autograph items. It occupies one room in the Bibliothèque Polonaise à Paris, which also houses the Musée Boleslas Biegas and the Salon Frédéric Chopin.

Guided visits are available Thursday afternoons and Saturday mornings by prior appointment; an admission fee is charged.

See also 
 List of museums in Paris

References

Bibliography 

 Paris Visites, Petit Futé, 2007, page 27. ..

Museums established in 1930
Museums in Paris
Mickiewicz, Adam
Literary museums in France
Museums of Polish culture abroad
Poetry museums
Buildings and structures in the 4th arrondissement of Paris
Adam Mickiewicz